The Big Horn Mountain Radio Network is a four-station small-market broadcasting company in northern Wyoming, and is one of three divisions of Legend Communications of Wyoming, LLC. It is based in Buffalo, Wyoming. The other two divisions are Basin Radio Network in Gillette and Big Horn Radio Network in Cody.

All three divisions are licensee divisions of Legend Communications of Wyoming, LLC, which owns and operates 18 radio broadcasting stations across Wyoming.  
The company is based at 1949 Mountain View Drive, Cody, Wyoming 82414 and 6805 Douglas Legum Drive, Suite 100, Elkridge, Maryland 20175. The corporate president is Dr. W. Lawrence Patrick, a radio industry professional for over 35 years, who holds Ph.D. in communications and management, as well as a law degree. The co-owner is Susan K. Patrick, M.B.A.

The studios are at 1221 Fort St. in Buffalo and 324 Coffeen Avenue in Sheridan.

 KBBS (1450 AM) "Classic Country 1450 AM KBBS"
 KHRW (92.7 FM) "92.7 The Eagle"
 KLGT (96.5 FM) "KIX 96.5"
 KZZS (98.3 FM) "98-3 The Peak"

References

External links
 Big Horn Mountain Radio Network
 Basin Radio Network

Radio broadcasting companies of the United States
Companies based in Wyoming